Edward Patterson may refer to:

 Edward White Patterson (1895–1940), U.S. Representative from Kansas
 Edward McWilliam Patterson (1926–2013), English mathematician